Mohd Khairul Anuar Jamil (born on 7 January 1981) is a Malaysian former footballer who currently works as coach for PJ Rangers.

He had previously been playing for Telekom Melaka,  and KL Plus before he signed with Felda United FC.

In 2004, he was capped once with the national team.

References

External links
 

1981 births
Living people
Malaysian footballers
Malaysia international footballers
People from Selangor
Association football midfielders